Louisa MacGregor Rix (born 2 February 1955) is a former actress and interior designer. She is the daughter of actors Brian Rix and Elspet Gray. She studied drama at LAMDA and acted for many years on TV and in the theatre.

Rix gained early theatre experience at the Nottingham Playhouse while Richard Eyre was the artistic director, and in Peter Cheeseman's company at Stoke-on-Trent. Her subsequent West End appearances included roles in How the Other Half Loves and Man of the Moment by Alan Ayckbourn; The Pocket Dream by Sandi Toksvig & Elly Brewer; and Whose Life is it Anyway? by Brian Clark, as well as several productions at the National Theatre.

Rix is known for playing Kevin the teenager's mum (Mrs Patterson) in the TV series Harry Enfield and Chums, and in the movie Kevin & Perry Go Large. For Granada Television she co-starred with Tim Bentinck in Made In Heaven.  She played Mel Smith's girlfriend in two series of Colin's Sandwich and starred in two series of Side By Side, both for the BBC. In Brookside she performed with Anna Friel as the solicitor representing the Jordache family in the 'body under the patio' storyline. She played the vocally-challenged night club singer Melody Lane in a feature-length Coronation Street special with the QEII as the location. One of her final acting roles was as the Home Secretary in The Execution of Gary Glitter.

Having originally studied art before she went to drama school, Rix retired from acting to pursue her passion for design. Since 2012, she has run the interior design company Forbes Rix Designs with her business partner Natalie Forbes.

Personal life
In 1980, Rix married actor Jonathan Coy, with whom she has two children, Charlotte and Jolyon Coy. Charlotte Elizabeth (born 1983) is married to Tom Mison. Jolyon is married to Blanche Schofield, daughter of David Schofield and Lally Percy. Rix and Coy divorced in 1990. She married writer Richard Ommanney in 1994.

Louisa's elder sister Shelley was born with Down's Syndrome. From the date of her birth onward, her father, actor Brian Rix, promoted awareness and understanding of learning difficulties. Shelley died in 2005. Their brother Jamie Rix is a television producer and an author of children's books, while their other brother, Jonty Rix, is a Professor of Participation and Learning Support at the Open University and author of the rites-of-passage novel Some Hope. Their paternal aunt, Sheila Mercier, played Annie Sugden in Emmerdale Farm for over 20 years.

Rix is a member of the House Committee at Denville Hall and a Trustee.

Filmography

References

External links

1955 births
Living people
British film actresses
British television actresses
Actresses from London
Daughters of life peers
People from Kensington
20th-century British actresses
21st-century British actresses
20th-century English women
20th-century English people
21st-century English women
21st-century English people